Dave Kershaw (born 18 October 1955) is a Shotokan karateka from Grimsby, Lincolnshire. He was an international competitor, representing Great Britain at European and World Championships between 1982 and 1998, and was British Kata Champion (Shotokan Karate International of Great Britain) for a record six consecutive years, from 1987 to 1992. He was a senior SKI (GB) Instructor and Examiner up until 2011, when he formed his own organisation: Konjaku Shin International.

He began his karate training in 1972, with the late Brian Woods, at his dojo at Nunsthorpe School in Grimsby. In 1974, he joined the newly formed Shotokan Karate International of Great Britain, and began training with Hanshi Shiro Asano. He also trained with Shotokan Karate International Federation Chief Instructor Hirokazu Kanazawa during his twice yearly visits to the UK.

In 1978, he set up his own club called Konjaku Shin (literally meaning "Ancient and Modern Spirit"), at a photography club in Cleethorpes. Later, he was running clubs in Grimsby, Cleethorpes and Immingham Leisure centres.

In 1981, he was captain of the SKI (GB) A-Team, winning the English Karate Federation All Styles Three Man Kata title.

His international competition career began in 1982, when Hanshi Asano chose him to compete in a four nation, European competition in Munich; his team came second. In 1991, he was an individual kumite finalist in the Shotokan Karate-do International Federation World Championships, Mexico City. In 1998, at the SKIEF European Championships in Sheffield, he took silver medal in the Men's (40-44) kata, and his team took gold medal in the veteran three man team kata.

In 1992, Hanshi Asano awarded him the Wilkinson Sword of Honour, for services to karate-do.

In 1993, he opened the club's own premises in Lower Spring Street Grimsby.

In 2001, he was invited to teach in Amritsar, India, by the Punjab Karate Association, and became their Chief Technical Advisor.

In August 2011, he was graded to Nanadan (7th Dan) by Hanshi Shiro Asano.

In June 2019, he was awarded the grade of Hachidan (8th Dan) by the Konjaku Shin International Dan Grade Board of Examiners, ratified by the International Shotokan-ryu Karate-do Shihankai (ISKS); an organisation of senior international instructors.

References

External links 
 Konjaku Shin website

Shotokan practitioners
British male karateka
Living people
1955 births